The 1987 Lorraine Open was a men's tennis tournament played on indoor carpet courts in Nancy, France, and was part of the 1987 Nabisco Grand Prix. It was the ninth edition of the tournament took place from 23 March through 29 March 1987. First-seeded Pat Cash won the singles title.

Finals

Singles
 Pat Cash defeated  Wally Masur 6–2, 6–3
 It was Cash' 1st singles title of the year and the 3rd of his career.

Doubles
 Ramesh Krishnan /  Claudio Mezzadri defeated  Grant Connell /  Larry Scott 6–4, 6–4

References

External links
 ITF tournament edition details

Lorraine Open
Lorraine Open
Lorraine Open
March 1987 sports events in Europe